Forevermore is the fourth studio album by American singer David Archuleta. The album is composed of covers of Filipino songs and was released on March 26, 2012, exclusively in the Philippines.  This is Archuleta's first Original Pilipino Music (OPM) album.

Album information 
The album was released on March 26, 2012, under the exclusive licensee and distributor of Sony Music products in the Philippines, Ivory Music and Video. International fans are able to purchase the physical album from the official website of Archuleta or download them digitally from MyMusicStore International, a music store website based in the Philippines. The album became available on ITunes Stores worldwide on April 18, 2012, but was later removed from the store on April 23, for unknown reasons.

The album also contains four bonus tracks, including the song "Nandito Ako" from the mini-series of the same name.

The album received a Gold Record Award.

An expanded edition of the album came out in November 2012.

In 2012, Forevermore was certified gold in the Philippines.

Singles 
Both "Forevermore" and "Nandito Ako" were released both as official singles from the album, and became available as a digital download on March 15, 2012. "Forevermore" also received an official music video. Late in June, it was announced that "I'll Never Go" would be released as the album's second single. On June 11, Ivory Music & Video released a 33-second preview of the official music video for the song, which premiered on June 24.

Track listing

References 

2012 albums
David Archuleta albums
Covers albums